C. B. Atkins & C. E. Snow by Special Request, (also known as simply by Special Request), is the title of a recording by Chet Atkins and Hank Snow, released in 1969.

History
Atkins and Snow had a history of collaborations—their first single was "Reminiscing" and they had a hit single in 1955, a guitar duet called "Silver Bell."

Snow was a regular at the Grand Ole Opry and had a long and illustrious entertainment career. Atkins rose from radio and session work to become not only a performing and recording artist and producer, but also an executive at RCA.

Atkins and Snow's previous release Reminiscing  and by Special Request are both out of print and have not been re-issued on CD.

Track listing

Personnel 
 Chet Atkins – guitar, vocals
 Hank Snow – guitar, vocals
Production notes
 Produced by Chet Atkins and Ronnie Light
 Arranged by Bill Walker
 Engineer – Tom Pick
 Recording technician – Leslie Ladd
 Cover photo by Jimmy Moore and Bill Grime

References 

1969 albums
Chet Atkins albums
Albums produced by Chet Atkins
RCA Records albums
Hank Snow albums
Collaborative albums